Let's Live a Little is a studio album by country music singer Carl Smith. It was released in 1958 by Columbia Records (catalog no. CL-1172).

In Billboard magazine's annual poll of country and western disc jockeys, it was ranked No. 14 among the "Favorite Country Music LPs" of 1958.

AllMusic gave the album a rating of four stars.

Track listing
Side A
 "Let's Live a Little"
 "Mr. Moon"
 "Night Train to Memphis"
 "Slowly"
 "Hang Your Head in Shame"
 "The Best Years of Your Life"

Side B
 "If Teardrops Were Pennies"
 "More and More"
 "Sweet Little Miss Blue Eyes"
 "Honky-Tonk Man"
 "I Love You a Thousand Ways"
 "I Overlooked an Orchid (While Looking for a Rose)"

References

1958 albums
Carl Smith (musician) albums
Columbia Records albums